Faria Lima is a metro station on Line 4-Yellow of the São Paulo Metro operated by ViaQuatro. It is localized in Avenida Brigadeiro Faria Lima, between Rua Teodoro Sampaio and Rua Cardeal Arcoverde, in the district of Pinheiros. Had its civil construction concluded in February 2010. The prediction for the commercial operation was March 2010, but was delayed to 25 May 2010, day which line started operating between stations Faria Lima and Paulista. The delay was caused by the train tests. The station should also have a connection with future Line 20-Pink (Santa Marina–Santo André).

Characteristics
Underground station with side platforms and structure in apparent concrete. It has access for people with disabilities and connection with urban bus terminal. It has capacity for 30,000 passengers per hour during peak hours.

The station has 10 ViaQuatro customer service and maintenance agents and 10 customer service and security agents, beside ambulances in the location.

Station layout

References

São Paulo Metro stations
Railway stations opened in 2010
Railway stations located underground in Brazil
2010 establishments in Brazil